The twelfth season of Criminal Minds was ordered on May 6, 2016, by CBS with an order of 22 episodes. The season premiered on September 28, 2016, and ended on May 10, 2017.

Cast

Main cast 

 Joe Mantegna as Supervisory Special Agent David Rossi (BAU Senior Agent)
 Matthew Gray Gubler as Supervisory Special Agent Dr. Spencer Reid (BAU Agent)
 A. J. Cook as Supervisory Special Agent Jennifer "JJ" Jareau (BAU Agent)
 Kirsten Vangsness as Special Agent Penelope Garcia (BAU Technical Analyst & Co-Communications Liaison)
 Damon Gupton as Supervisory Special Agent Stephen Walker (BAU Agent) (Ep. 8-22)
 Aisha Tyler as Supervisory Special Agent Dr. Tara Lewis (BAU Agent)
 Adam Rodriguez as Supervisory Special Agent Luke Alvez (BAU Agent)
 Thomas Gibson as Supervisory Special Agent Aaron Hotchner (BAU Unit Chief & Co-Communications Liaison) (Ep. 1–2)
 Paget Brewster as Supervisory Special Agent Emily Prentiss (BAU Unit Chief & Co-Communications Liaison) (Ep. 3-22)

Special guest stars
 Jane Lynch as Diana Reid
 Alana de la Garza as Clara Seger
 Daniel Henney as Supervisory Special Agent Matt Simmons (BAU Agent)
 Shemar Moore as Derek Morgan

Recurring 

 Bodhi Elfman as Peter Lewis / Mr. Scratch
 Angela Robinson Witherspoon as Cassie Campbell
 Jeananne Goossen as Fiona Duncan
 Harold Perrineau as Calvin Shaw
 Richard T. Jones as Officer Lionel Wilkins
 Gia Mantegna as Lindsey Vaughn
 Aubrey Plaza as Cat Adams

Guest stars
 Josh Stewart as William LaMontagne Jr.
 Mekhai Andersen as Henry LaMontagne
Sherilyn Fenn as Gloria Baker
Pooch Hall as FBI Trainee Clark
Tatum O'Neal as Miranda White
David Otunga as Dwayne Jerrard
Beth Riesgraf as Maeve Donovan
Tracie Thoms as Monica Walker

Production

Development
Criminal Minds was renewed for a twelfth season with an episode order of 22 episodes on May 6, 2016. The season began on September 28, 2016. The entire main cast returned for the season, except Shemar Moore (Derek Morgan), who left the show during the eleventh season.

Casting

After Shemar Moore's departure in the previous season, former CSI: Miami star Adam Rodriguez was cast to fill his void in the twelfth season. He will play Luke Alvez, a new recruit to the BAU from the FBI's Fugitive Task Force, tasked with helping to capture an escaped killer from last season. On July 21, Kirsten Vangsness confirmed that Paget Brewster would reprise her role as SSA Emily Prentiss for multiple episodes. On August 10, 2016, Aisha Tyler, who joined the show in the previous season as Dr. Tara Lewis, was promoted to a series regular.

On August 30, 2016, Brewster was promoted to series regular, following Thomas Gibson's firing. Jane Lynch reprised her role as Dr. Diana Reid, Spencer Reid's schizophrenic mother after eight years. She appeared in the second half of the season in a multi-episode arc.

To fill the void after Gibson's firing, Damon Gupton was cast in the series regular role of Special Agent Stephen Walker, a profiler from the Behavioral Analysis Program in the FBI. He made his first appearance in the eighth episode.

Shemar Moore reprised his role as Derek Morgan in the season finale as his character tried to help catch Mr. Scratch after bringing the BAU a lead in the case against him. 

During April 2017, it was revealed that Gia Mantegna would reprise her role as Lindsay Vaughn in the final 3 episodes of the season. It was also revealed that Beth Riesgraf would reprise her role as Maeve Donovan in the season finale.

Gibson's suspension and exit

On August 11, 2016, Deadline reported that Thomas Gibson had been suspended and therefore written out from two episodes due to an on-set altercation with one of the producers. He was also cut from directing one of the episodes. The following day, Gibson was fired following the on-set altercation. A joint statement from ABC Studios and CBS Television Studios read, "Thomas Gibson has been dismissed from Criminal Minds."

Gibson's character's exit was explained in the sixth episode of the season, "Elliot's Pond", when it was revealed that his character retired and went into witness protection because of Mr. Scratch stalking his son. Gibson would not appear in episode three to twenty-two. Paget Brewster was hired to replace him in the following episode as Emily Prentiss.

Episodes

Ratings

Live + SD ratings

Live + 7 Day (DVR) ratings

 Live +7 ratings were not available, so Live +3 ratings have been used instead.

Home media

References

External links
 

Criminal Minds
2016 American television seasons
2017 American television seasons